The Campeonato Fluminense was the football league of the state of Rio de Janeiro, Brazil, during the period when the Guanabara state and the Rio de Janeiro state were two separated states.

Until 1960, Rio de Janeiro city was the Brazilian capital and was not part of homonymous state. In the same year, with the inauguration of Brasília as the new capital of Brazil, the city of Rio de Janeiro became the new Guanabara state. Only in 1975 the states of Rio de Janeiro and Guanabara fused forming present day's Rio de Janeiro state, but the Campeonato Fluminense continued separately until 1978, after which all its clubs joined the city league, the Campeonato Carioca.

As most of the big clubs in the Campeonato Carioca have come from Rio de Janeiro city, the countryside clubs have rarely contended for the state title since the merger; only two countryside clubs, Americano and Volta Redonda, came close to winning the Carioca title, settling for runner-up in 2002 and 2005 respectively.

List of Champions

Amateur era

The first Campeonato Fluminense was disputed in 1915, right after the foundation of LSF (the first state football association). In 1928 the clubs were replaced by city XI teams, and the champion league represented the state. From 1941 to 1945 FFD (former AFEA) replaced the city XI teams by clubs. In 1946 the clubs were again replaced by city XI teams. These were the state champions clubs in the amateur era:

1915 - Ararigboya (Niterói)
1916 - Parnahyba (Niterói)
1917 - Odeon (Niterói)
1918 - Nictheroyense (Niterói)
1919 - Fluminense (Niterói)
1920 - Fluminense (Niterói)
1921 - Barreto (Niterói)
1922 - Byron (Niterói)
1923 - Barreto (Niterói)
1924 - Byron (Niterói)
1924 - Byron (Niterói) - extra championship
1925 - Serrano (Petrópolis) - AFEA championship
1925 - Byron (Niterói) - LSF championship
1926 - Elite (Niterói)
1927 - Gragoatá (Niterói)
1928 - Niterói team
1928 - Niterói team
1930 - Niterói team
1931 - Niterói team
1932 - not disputed
1933 - not disputed
1934 - Barra do Piraí team 
1935 - Niterói team
1936 - Campos team
1937 - not disputed
1938 - Niterói team
1939 - Campos team
1940 - Campos and Nova Friburgo team
1941 - Icaraí (Niterói)
1942 - Royal (Barra do Piraí)
1943 - Icaraí (Niterói)
1944 - Petropolitano (Petrópolis)
1945 - Serrano (Petrópolis)
1946 - not held
1947 - Campos team
1948 - Petrópolis team
1949 - Petrópolis team
1950 - Barra do Piraí team
1951 - Barra do Piraí team

Professional era

In 1951, FFD (Federação Fluminense de Desportos) formed a professional department (the D.E.P.), which carried out the first professional club state championship. Since then the state championship was disputed by the professional champions of each region. From 1959 on, the Fluminense champions had berths in the Taça Brasil, but neither the later Roberto Gomes Pedrosa tournament and its successor, the Campeonato Brasileiro, awarded berths to the Fluminense champions.

1952 - Adrianino (Engenheiro Paulo de Frontin)
1952 - Adrianino (Engenheiro Paulo de Frontin) - extra championship
1953 - Barra Mansa FC (Barra Mansa)
1953 - Barra Mansa FC (Barra Mansa) (Superchampionship)
1954 - Coroados (Valença)
1955 - Frigorífico (Mendes)
1955 - Goytacaz FC (Campos) (Superchampionship)
1956 - not finished
1957 - not finished
1958 - Manufatora (Niterói)
1959 - Fonseca AC (Niterói)
1960 - Fonseca AC (Niterói)
1961 - Rio Branco (Campos)
1962 - Fonseca AC (Niterói)
1963 - Goytacaz FC (Campos)
1964 - Americano FC (Campos)
1964 - Eletrovapo (Niterói) (Superchampionship)
1965 - Americano FC (Campos)
1966 - Goytacaz FC (Campos)
1967 - Goytacaz FC (Campos)
1968 - Americano FC (Campos)
1969 - Americano FC (Campos)
1970 - Central (Barra do Piraí)
1971 - Central (Barra do Piraí)
1972 - Barbará (Barra Mansa)
1973 - Barbará (Barra Mansa)
1974 - Sapucaia (Campos)
1975 - Americano FC (Campos)

In 1975, although the Rio de Janeiro and Guanabara states had already fused, the federations were still separate. The FFD organized the Countryside State Championship:
1976 - Central (Barra do Piraí)
1977 - Manufatora (Niterói)

In 1978 the federations merged into the new FERJ. However, on this year FERJ still organized a Countryside Championship, considered the last Campeonato Fluminense:

1978 - Goytacaz FC (Campos)

Titles by team
Americano FC - 5
Goytacaz FC - 5
Byron - 4
Fonseca AC - 3
Adrianino AC - 2
Central SC - 2
Fluminense AC - 2
AA Barbará - 2
Icaraí FC - 2
AD Niterói (as Manufatora AC) - 2
Serrano FC - 2
Barra Mansa FC - 2
Barreto - 2
Coroados FC - 1
AE Eletrovapo - 1
SC Elite - 1
Frigorífico AC - 1
GR Gragoatá - 1
Petropolitano FC - 1
CE Rio Branco - 1
Royal SC - 1
EC Sapucaia - 1
Nictheroyense - 1
Odeon - 1
Parnahyba - 1
Ararigboya - 1

See also
Campeonato Carioca
Campeonato da Cidade de Niterói
Campeonato da Cidade de Campos

References
RSSSF Brasil (https://web.archive.org/web/20070325233744/http://paginas.terra.com.br/esporte/rsssfbrasil/tables/rjflucamp.htm)

External links
RSSSF Brasil (https://web.archive.org/web/20070325233744/http://paginas.terra.com.br/esporte/rsssfbrasil/tables/rjflucamp.htm)

Fluminense
Football leagues in Rio de Janeiro (state)